Aleksei Leonidovich Arkhangelsky (born 9 September 1986) is a retired Russian professional football player.

External links
 
 

1986 births
Living people
Russian footballers
Association football goalkeepers
Russian expatriate footballers
Expatriate footballers in Belarus
FC Darida Minsk Raion players
FC Sever Murmansk players
Belarusian Premier League players